Chan is a non-pinyin romanisation of multiple Chinese surnames, based on different varieties of Chinese.

Among respondents to the 2000 United States Census, Chan was the 12th-most common surname among Asian Pacific Americans, and 459th-most common overall, with 59,811 bearers (91.0% of whom identified as Asian/Pacific Islander). Chan was the ninth-most common Chinese surname in Singapore as of 1997 (ranked by English spelling, rather than by Chinese characters). Roughly 48,400 people, or 1.9% of the Chinese Singaporean population, bore the surname Chan.

Cantonese romanisation of 陈/陳
Chan is a Cantonese romanisation of the surname spelled in pinyin as Chén.

Diana Ming Chan (1929–2008), American social worker of Chinese descent
Amy Chan (badminton) (born 1961), Hong Kong badminton player
Isabel Chan (born 1979), Hong Kong actress
Gemma Chan (born 1982), English actress and model of Chinese descent
Eugene Chan, Hong Kong linguist

Hokkien romanisation of 曾
Chan is a Hokkien romanisation of the surname spelled in pinyin as Zēng (曾). People with this surname include:

 James Chan Soon Cheong (曾順祥; born 1926), Malaysian Roman Catholic bishop
 Chan Soo Sen (曾士生; born 1956), Singaporean politician
 Soo K. Chan (曾仕乾; born 1962), Singaporean architect
 Chan Kwok Fai (曾國琿; born 1982), Malaysian singer
 Dinah Chan (曾秀卿; born 1986), Singapore road cyclist
 Jasper Chan (曾羽辉; born 1988), Singaporean footballer
 Chan Kwong Beng (曾廣銘; born 1988), Malaysian badminton player
 Chan Boon Yong (曾文勇), Malaysian diamantaire
 Jannie Chan (曾秀丽), Singaporean luxury retail businesswoman
 Joel Chan (photographer) (曾俊彦), Singaporean-born Australian photographer
 Priscelia Chan (曾詩梅), Singaporean actress
 Chan Tien Ghee (曾長義), Malaysian businessman

Mandarin Wade–Giles romanisation of 詹

Chan is a Mandarin Wade–Giles romanisation (often used in Taiwan) of the surname spelled in pinyin as Zhān (詹). People with this surname include:

 Chan Chun-po (詹春柏; born 1941), Taiwanese Kuomintang politician
 Steve Chan (詹啟賢; born 1948), Taiwanese Kuomintang politician and physician
 Thomas Chan (詹順貴; born 1963), Taiwanese Green Party politician
 Chan Ya-wen (詹雅雯; born 1967), Taiwanese Hokkien pop singer
 Chan Yih-shin (詹益信; born 1977), Taiwanese golfer
 Faye Chan (詹雯婷; born 1981), Taiwanese singer
 Chan Chin-wei (詹謹瑋; born 1985), Taiwanese female tennis player
 Yako Chan (詹子晴; born 1988), Taiwanese singer and actress
 Chan Che-Yuan (詹哲淵; born 1989), Taiwanese football midfielder
 Chan Yung-jan (詹詠然; born 1989), Taiwanese tennis player
 Chan Hao-ching (詹皓晴; born 1993), Taiwanese tennis player, younger sister of Chan Yung-jan
 Chan Sheng-Yao (詹聖堯), Taiwanese Buddhist master and artist
 Chan Ting-I (詹婷怡), Taiwanese politician

Mandarin Wade–Giles romanisation of 战/戰
Chan is a Mandarin Wade–Giles romanisation (often used in Taiwan) of the surname spelled in pinyin as Zhàn (战/戰). People with this surname include:
 Elisa Chan (戰琬瑜), American politician in Texas

Other
Chan is a romanisation of the surname spelled in pinyin as Tián (田). People with this surname include:
 Chan Seng Khai (田承凱; born 1953), Malaysian politician in Sarawak
 Jeremy Chan (田銘耀; born 1981), Singaporean actor and singer

See also

Chal (name)
Char (name)
Jeffery Paul Chan (1942–2022), American writer and scholar

References

Chinese-language surnames
Multiple Chinese surnames
Surnames of Cambodian origin
Khmer-language surnames